Joel Elias Spingarn High School was a public high school located in the District of Columbia, USA. The school is named after Joel Elias Spingarn (1875–1939) an American educator and literary critic who established the Spingarn Medal in 1913, awarded annually for outstanding achievement by an African American.

History 
Spingarn High School opened in 1952, as a new and modern segregated high school for African American students. It was the last segregated high school built in Washington, DC, just two years before the U.S. Supreme Court ended school segregation in Brown v. Board of Education.

The formal dedication ceremonies in December 1953 were attended by Joel Spingarn's widow, Amy Spingarn, and by Spingarn Medal winners Paul Robeson and W. E. B. Du Bois. The principal speaker at the dedication was Howard University professor John Hope Franklin.

Dr. Purvis J. Wiliams was the first principal and served until 1971. Under his leadership, Spingarn gained a reputation as one of the top black schools in the district.  Spingarn's enrollment was around 1500 students, who were almost entirely black even after desegregation.

Woodson Junior High School students were housed in Spingarn High School from 1962 to 1963.

Spingarn High School closed at the end of the 2012-13 school year due to low enrollment which had dropped to 374 students that year.

In May 2014, the school was added to the National Register of Historic Places.

Basketball teams
Spingarn High School had one of DC's most impressive basketball histories and has produced well-known players such as Elgin Baylor, Dave Bing and Sherman Douglas. Spingarn has played in more City Title games than all but one DC public school and won in 1961, 1980, 1985 and 2000. The school has also played in nine DCIAA title games and won consecutively for three years between 2000 and 2003.

Notable alumni 
 Elgin Baylor, a retired Hall of Fame American basketball player and former NBA general manager who played 13 seasons as a forward for the Minneapolis / Los Angeles Lakers.
 Dave Bing, a retired Hall of Fame American professional basketball player in the NBA, primarily for the Detroit Pistons from 1966 to 1975 and a former Mayor of Detroit from 2009 to 2013.
 John B. Catoe Jr., former general manager of the Washington Metropolitan Area Transit Authority
 Sherman Douglas, a retired American professional basketball player who played in the NBA for the Miami Heat, Boston Celtics, Milwaukee Bucks, New Jersey Nets and the Los Angeles Clippers from 1989 to 2001.
 Michael Graham, a retired American professional basketball player who played on Georgetown University's 1984 national championship team.
 Ollie Johnson, a retired American basketball player who was an All-American at the University of San Francisco and a first round draft pick of the Boston Celtics.
 Earl Jones, a retired American professional basketball player who was drafted by the Los Angeles Lakers.
 John Kinard, founding director of the Anacostia Museum, a Smithsonian Institution museum
 Willie Royster, former MLB player for the Baltimore Orioles
 Stan Washington, retired NBA player for the Washington Bullets
 Clarence Musgrove, former All-American athlete in track and field, inducted into the Catholic University Hall of Fame
 Mike Hinnant, former NFL player, inducted into the Temple University Hall of Fame
 Warren Buck III, physics professor at Hampton University who established the university's physics doctoral program. Also served as the first chancellor of University of Washington Bothell.

References

Educational institutions established in 1952
Educational institutions disestablished in 2013
Defunct schools in Washington, D.C.
District of Columbia Public Schools
African-American history of Washington, D.C.
School buildings on the National Register of Historic Places in Washington, D.C.
1952 establishments in Washington, D.C.